John L. Brunner (August 18, 1929 – January 1, 1980) was a Democratic member of the Pennsylvania House of Representatives.

References

1980 deaths
Democratic Party members of the Pennsylvania House of Representatives
1929 births
20th-century American politicians